Panau borealis is a moth in the family Cossidae. It was described by Yakovlev in 2004. It is found in China (Yunnan).

References

Natural History Museum Lepidoptera generic names catalog

Zeuzerinae
Moths described in 2004